Qullissat (old spelling: Qutdligssat) is a former settlement in the Qeqertalik municipality, located on the north-east coast of Disko Island on the west coast of Greenland. It was a coal mining town founded to exploit the national resources of Disko Island. The mines operated for 48 years until 1972, when the economic base of the settlement collapsed, leading to its abandonment.

History 

Qullissat was not a traditional Inuit settlement, but was founded in 1924 as a coal mining town. By 1966 the mine was producing 40,000 tonnes of coal a year and the town had a population of 1,400, making it the sixth-largest population centre in Greenland. The coal mine attracted a multinational population, with Danes, Swedes, and British people working in the mines.

In 1960 Nanok Idraetslag were crowned champions of the 1959–60 Greenlandic Football Championship.

The Greenland Provincial Council voted to close the mine in 1966 due to falling profits and demand, poor quality coal and a lack of labour force in the cod fishing industry. Residents were to be moved after a relocation plan was completed. The mine was eventually closed on 4 October 1972, despite the fact that the cod industry had collapsed in the interim. By then 700 residents had already moved, and the remaining 500 were compulsorily relocated. Kuupik Kleist, later Prime Minister of Greenland, was born in Qullissat, and was the last person to be confirmed, before the settlement was abandoned in 1972.

The town was sold on 20 October 1972 to an entrepreneur, who demolished the site. The town's church was spared and relocated to nearby Ilulissat.

In November 2000 Qullissat was hit by a tsunami caused by a large landslide in Paatuut at the Nuussuaq peninsula. The tsunami reached more than 100 meters inland and would have cost many lives had the town still been inhabited.

In popular culture 
Greenlandic rock band Sumé made the mining town's demise the topic of a song called "Qullissat" on their 1974 album Inuit Nunaat.

Geography 

Notable residents 
 Kuupik Kleist, former Prime Minister of Greenland (2009-2013)
 Aka Hoegh, Greenlandic artist
 Makka Kleist (born 1951), actress

References

Disko Island
Former populated places in Greenland
Populated places established in 1924
Populated places disestablished in 1972